Myra Musselman-Carr  (November 27, 1871 or 72 or 1880–1929)  American sculptor born in Georgetown, Kentucky

She studied first at the Art Academy of Cincinnati in  Cincinnati, Ohio, then in New York City at the Art Students League and finally with Antoine Bourdelle in Paris.  She is believed to have been an early proponent of the direct carving method of sculpting.  Around 1915 to 1917 she founded the Modern Art School in New York and taught sculpture there, alongside co-founders and painting teachers Marguerite Zorach and William Zorach.

Armory Show of 1913
Musselman-Carr was one of the artists who exhibited at this important show which included two of her bronze statuettes entitled Electra ($50) and Indian grinding corn ($40).

Musselman-Carr was a member of the Woodstock Artists Association.

References

1871 births
American women sculptors
19th-century American sculptors
Year of death missing
20th-century American sculptors